Samsung GT-S5230 (also known as Tocco Lite, Avila, Samsung Star and Samsung Player One) is an entry-level touchscreen feature phone announced in March 2009 and released in May 2009 by Samsung.

It is available in black, white, and pink, and there are gold and silver special editions. The phone has a 3.0" LCD with 262K Color WQVGA. In total the device measures 104x53x11.9 mm. It uses a WAP 2.0 browser and makes use of Java MIDP 2.0 as its Java support platform. It uses S3C2410 (CPU) at 200 MHz.

Compared to the previous Samsung F480 Tocco, the S5230 (as its "Lite" name would suggest) is a more budget model with a weaker camera, albeit with a slightly increased display size. By default the S5230 does not support a 3G network connection and the base model lacks Wi-Fi connectivity; the S5230W and S5233W variants do support Wi-Fi.

The phone has a 3.2-megapixel camera with video recording, the camera having a smile mode and 4x digital zoom. The phone has software for editing photos and videos and music recognition. Its storage can be upgraded to 16 GB with a microSD card. The UI includes widgets which can display information from the internet. The phone has an inbuilt accelerometer for motion gaming and social networking.

Full specifications

Platform
 GSM & EDGE 850/900/1800/1900 MHz
 Operating system: Proprietary
 UI: TouchWiz 1.0
 WAP Navigator 2.0, based on WebKit Open Source Project
 Java MIDP 2.0

Size
 Dimensions: 106 x 53.5 x 11.8 mm
 Weight: 93.5 g

External display
 3" TFT LCD, 240 x 400 pixel WQVGA resolution 262K color
 Resistive touchscreen
 Full haptic touchscreen

Battery
 Li-ion 1000 mAh
 Up to 10 hours talk time
 Up to 800 hours  standby time
 Long lasting battery

Camera
 3.2-megapixel
 Digital zoom of 4x
 Multiple shot modes; Continuous/Mosaic Shot/Frame shot/Panorama shot/Smile Shot
 Multiple effects; black & white, sepia, negative, watercolour
 Photo editing; frames, text and a small collection of clip art

Video
 MPEG4/H.263/H.264/WMV/3GP video player
 15 fps@QVGA video recording
 Video messaging, video streaming
 MP4
 320x180, bit rate 128 kbit/s

Music and sound
 Music player
 The following file formats; MP3, AAC, AAC+, e-AAC+, WMA, AMR, WAV
 3D Sound Technology (DNSe)
 Music library
 Digital rights management (DRM): WMDRM (ILA) OMADRM1.0 OMADRM2.0 (operator dependent)

Fun and entertainment
 Embedded Java games
 Embedded wallpaper
 Pod casting
 RSS feeds
 FM radio with RDS

Office
 Document viewer: Yes
 Mobile printing using PictBridge
 Voice mail
 Offline mode

Messaging
 SMS/MMS
 Email (POP3/SMTP/IMAP4)
 T9 input
 Full QWERTY keyboard when in landscape mode.
 Full AZERTY keyboard when in landscape mode and the T9 language is set in French
 Accelerometer

Memory
 102 MB standard
 Up to 16 GB with SD/MC (varies with specific model)
 2000 phone book entries
 500 messages (200 inbox, 200 sent, 50 outbox, 50 draft)

Call functions
 Speakerphone
 Call time management
 Multiparty (conference call)

These specification were provided from Samsung Mobile website.

Variants

The South African, Indian, Mexican, Brazilian, Russian, Italian, Belgian, Lithuanian, Portuguese and Australian variant is known as Samsung Star. In Poland it is known as Samsung Avila. In Pakistan it is marketed by the name of Samsung GT-S5233A but it is widely known as Samsung Star.
The S5230G comes with an integrated GPS receiver.
The phone also comes in another variant known as Samsung S5230W which supports Wi-Fi. It is called Samsung Star Wifi.
There is also a version of this handset that supports near field communication (NFC), but it is only available on a limited basis for use in NFC trials.

Box content
Standard contents are:
 Phone With Screen guard
 Battery
 Battery charger
 Headphones

References

s-5230
Mobile phones introduced in 2009